Santeria is a collaborative studio album by Italian rappers Marracash and Guè Pequeno, released on June 24, 2016, by Universal Music Group. As longtime friends, before the album, they recorded some underground mixtapes and works, and after that they had collaborated on their respective albums on some songs.

Background
On January 4, 2016, through social networks, the two rappers have revealed their intention to make an album together; in the past, Marracash and Guè Pequeno have worked together on various songs, including Fattore wow (in the album Marracash 2008), Big! and Brivido (present respectively in the albums Il ragazzo d'oro and Bravo ragazzo by Pequeno).

The album was recorded in Tenerife, Trancoso and Milan. The on June 7, the two rappers revealed the cover of the album, made by the Colombian visual artist Armando Mesìas, and also the title and the track list of the album.

Music and production
During an interview Guè Pequeno revealed that the album was designed to be "a real hip-hop record, with a very black sound, being culturally of high level, not something done to chase the Italian mainstream or the fads". The production of the album spaces from trap to old school beats, and it was praised for having an international sound, mixing various ages of hip hop.

Lyrics and themes
In the album there are several songs that tell directly the vision of the life and music of the two rappers, having at the same time ironic and soft songs that, with a lucid and sharp criticism, criticize today's social and musical aspects. Among the topics covered are more disaffection among young people, the different faces of success and false ideals to which it sells off the art.

Track listing

Charts

References

2016 albums
Marracash albums